Kai Sakakibara (born 29 July 1996) is an Australian male BMX rider, representing his nation at international competitions. He competed in the time trial event at the 2015 UCI BMX World Championships.

References

External links
 
 

1996 births
Living people
BMX riders
Australian male cyclists
Australian people of British descent
Australian people of Japanese descent
People with traumatic brain injuries
Sportspeople from the Gold Coast, Queensland
Cyclists from Queensland